Grace Potter and the Nocturnals is the third studio album by American rock band Grace Potter and the Nocturnals, released on June 8, 2010. The album is the band's first release since the inclusion of two new members, rhythm guitarist Benny Yurco and bassist Catherine Popper. The album was originally titled "Medicine" after the third track on the album, and was promoted as such in numerous interviews and early reviews, but was changed shortly after the replacement of producer T Bone Burnett in favor of Mark Batson.

The album debuted at #19 on the Billboard Top 200 Albums for the week ending June 13, 2010.

Critical reception

The album was released to generally favorable reviews, scoring a 63 on Metacritic. Billboard magazine gave the album a positive review, stating that "Grace Potter & the Nocturnals' new self-titled release finds frontwoman Potter and her band in full bloom, hammering out hook-heavy rock tracks with a confident, natural sound." Giving the album three out of five stars, Rolling Stone magazine comments, "Potter's youthfulness can make for flower-soup lyrics but backlit by a no-nonsense band that massages Memphis grooves, light rock and pinot-noir reggae, it all bursts with promise."  The Guardian enjoyed the band's harder rocking songs while criticizing some of the slower ones. The Guardian remarks that "[g]enerally, the bluesy, Southernised rockers (Medicine, Only Love) make more of an impression than the power balladry (Colors), while an anomalous wallow in country-rock sentimentality (Things I Never Needed) feels like it was tacked on because they realised they needed a slow one."

Track listing

     
The songs "Paris (Ooh La La)" and "That Phone" were used in the CW show Hart of Dixie (2011).
"Paris (Ooh La La)" and "Hot Summer Night" were used in an episode of the MTV series Awkward (2011).
"Paris (Ooh La La)" was used in a Rizzoli & Isles commercial.

Personnel
Adapted credits from the booklet.

The Nocturnals
Grace Potter – lead vocals, electric guitar (track 1), acoustic guitar (track 9), piano (tracks 6, 8 and 13), Hammond organ (tracks 2-12)
Scott Tournet – lead guitar (tracks 1-3, 5-7, 10-12), backwards guitar (track 5), lap steel guitar (tracks 4, 8-9 and 13), loops (track 3), harmonica (track 4), vocals (track 3)
Benny Yurco – rhythm guitar 
Catherine Popper – bass guitar
Matt Burr – drums, percussion (track 3)

Additional musicians
Mark Batson – piano (tracks 5 and 11), drum machine (track 8), hand claps (track 12), string arrangement (track 6) 
Janna Jacoby – violin (track 6)
Kathleen Robertson – violin (track 6)
Thomas Tally – viola (track 6)
Peggy Baldwin – cello (track 6)

Production
Aaron Fessel – engineer, mixing (tracks 2 and 7)
Brian Warwick – assistant engineer
Bobby Campbell – assistant mixer
Michael Parnin – Pro Tools engineer
Andrew Scheps – mixing
Brian Gardner – mastering

Artwork
GraphicTherapy – art direction and design
Adrien Broom – photography

Charts

References

2010 albums
Grace Potter and the Nocturnals albums
Hollywood Records albums
Albums produced by Mark Batson
Albums recorded at Westlake Recording Studios